Carl Henrik Kruusval, (born 10 November 1973) is a Swedish television presenter best known for presenting Landet runt which is broadcast on SVT.

Kruusval presents Landet Runt since 2010, he has previously worked for the local news program at Västnytt for SVT and has presented the local talk show Eftersnack, Kruusval has been an employee at SVT since 2003.

References

External links

Living people
1973 births